Johan Wellens (born 14 February 1956) is a Belgian former racing cyclist. He rode in the 1981 Tour de France. He is the brother of fellow racing cyclists Paul and Leo Wellens and the uncle of cyclist Tim Wellens. At the 1981 Tour, he and his brothers all rode for the Sunair–Sport 80–Colnago team as domestiques for Freddy Maertens.

References

External links
 

1956 births
Living people
Belgian male cyclists
Place of birth missing (living people)
Sportspeople from Hasselt
Cyclists from Limburg (Belgium)
20th-century Belgian people